Kamakhya Anand Vihar Terminal Express also known as North East Express is a Express train of Indian Railways - Northeast Frontier Railway zone that runs between Guwahati and Anand Vihar Terminal in India.

It operates as train number 12505 from Guwahati to Anand Vihar Terminal and as train number 12506 in the reverse direction serving the states of Assam, West Bengal, Bihar, Uttar Pradesh & Delhi.

Coaches

The 12505 / 06 Kamakhya Anand Vihar Terminal North East Express presently has 1 AC 2 tier, 3 AC 3 tier, 14 Sleeper Class, 4 General Unreserved & 2 SLR (Seating cum Luggage Rake) coaches. In addition it carries a Pantry car coach.

As is customary with most train services in India, Coach Composition may be amended at the discretion of Indian Railways depending on demand.

Speed

Routeing

The 12505 / 06 Kamakhya Anand Vihar Terminal North East Express runs from Kamakhya via New Jalpaiguri, Barauni Junction, Patna Junction, Mughalsarai Junction, Allahabad Junction, Kanpur Central, Tundla Junction to Anand Vihar Terminal.

References

External links

Express trains in India
Rail transport in Assam
Rail transport in West Bengal
Rail transport in Bihar
Rail transport in Uttar Pradesh
Rail transport in Delhi
Transport in Guwahati